Faik Bulut, (born 1950, Kağızman, Kars), is well-known a journalist, historian, writer and political commentator from Turkey, of Kurdish origin. Speaks Turkish, Kurdish, English, Arabic and French.

Biography

He graduated from Ankara Gazi University in 1980. He started journalism in 1985. He has authored near 40 books ever since.  Currently he is a public commentator for foreign TV channels and publishing columns in Independent Turkish.  His books has been cited 168 times since 2016 and 382 times since 1994 in peer-reviewed academic papers listed in google scholar.

Views on Marco Polo 

According to Faik Bulut, what the famous Marco Polo wrote about Order of Assassins does not reflect the truth and what he told in his memoirs: 
According to Bulut all of the above claims are a 100% false and the opinions of other scientists also support him in this regard. According to Bulut, it has been 15 years since Alamut Castle was destroyed by Mongols at the time Marco Polo claimed to have gone there. German archaeologists, who are conducting archaeological excavations in the region, say that they cannot even find the traces of rivers over which honey, milk or wine flows, concubines and virgins roam, and the castle is not large enough to contain all these. So Bulut emphasizes that Polo's writings are only legends he heard from sailors while in prison in Italy.

Journalism 

As a journalist and political commentator, he has been publishing articles, participating interviews, attending TV & Radio shows, such as CNN, BBC, The Independent Turkish, DW, Sputnik News Turkey, referenced by many authors and post graduation thesis in Turkey and globally.

Works 

Faik Bulut researches on Alevism, Kurds, Palestine State and Palestine Liberation Organization (PLO), Ottoman Empire, Middle East and Islamic History, Islamic Organizations, Secularism, History, Politics, Culture etc. Bulut has authored nearly 40 books and as a scholar he has an h-index of 11, i10-index of 12 while his books has been cited by academic articles and theses 382 times since 1994 according to Google Scholar.

Alevism history 
 Alevism without Ali, Berfin Publishing, 2011
 Hasan Sabbah Truth and Equalist Dervishan Republics, Berfin Publishing, 2014
 Islamic Communists: (Qarmatians)
 Abu Muslim Khorasani
 Whose Dormitory is Khorasan?
 How did We Come From Khorasan: The Road Story of Alevis, 2019

Middle East 
 Fading Colors of the Middle East (Yazidis, Circassians, Bedouins, Nusayris)
 Palestine Dream (Memoir)
 Palestine Intifada Lessons
 Sharia In The Shadow Algeria
 Iraq Invasion from Arab's Eyes

Kurds 
 Kurdish Revolts in the Eye of the State 
 Kurds in the Turkish Press
 Seeking a Solution to the Kurdish Question
 Dersim Reports
 Three Rebellions in a Narrow Triangle: Ethnic Conflicts in Kurdistan
 Kurdish Diplomacy (2 volumes)
 History of the Kurdish Language
 By the Pen of Ahmede Xane: The Unknown World of the Kurds (Second place in the 1995 Musa Anter Research Award)

Islamic and Islamic organizations 
 Democracy in the State of Allah: A Critique of the Sharia Order (1993 Turan Dursun Research Award)
 Islamist Organizations (3 volumes)
 Turkish Army and Religion: Islamist Activities in the Eyes of the State (1826 - 2007)
 Code Name: Hezbollah
 Who is this Fethullah Gülen?
 The Rise of Sect Capital 1: Criticism of Islamic economics
 The Rise of Sect Capital 2: Where does the Sect Capital go?
 Secrets of Al-Qaeda
 Religion, Nationalism and Women Debates in Committee of Union and Progress (2 volumes)
 Islam in the Global Age 1: The Western world and Secularism, Cumhuriyet Books
 Islam in the Global Age 2: Woman and Hijab, Cumhuriyet Books
 Islam in the Global Age 3: Sharia and Politics, Cumhuriyet Books
 Sexual Spells in Islam

See also 
 Order of Assassins
 Yazidis

References

External links 
 Faik Bulut's articles on History and Politics  on The Independent Turkey 

Turkish writers
Kurdish writers
Kurdish journalists
Living people
1950 births
People from Kağızman